Richard Clifton "Rich" Moore (born April 26, 1947) is a former American football defensive tackle in the National Football League (NFL) who played 20 games for the Green Bay Packers.  In 1969, the Green Bay Packers used the 12th pick in the 1st round of the 1969 NFL Draft to sign Moore out of Villanova University.  He had previously been named as a first-team tackle on the East Coast Athletic Conference all-conference team in 1968, his senior season at Villanova. Moore went on to play for two seasons with the Packers. He tore an Achilles tendon in a win over the Philadelphia Eagles in the 1970 season, and had surgery shortly thereafter, putting him out for the season. After trying him on offense during training camp in 1971, the Packers traded him to the New England Patriots for linebacker John Bramlett in late July 1971. However, Moore was unable to play for the Patriots in 1971 due to injury. He was then released by the Patriots in June 1972.

Moore's only known statistic is a single fumble recovery in the 1969 season. His son, Brandon Moore, later played offensive tackle for the New England Patriots from 1993 through 1995.

The 1969 Packers draft
Moore's selection is still remembered by Packers fans and observers as one of the most ill-fated in team history. Multiple writers have listed his selection as one of the most disappointing Packers draft picks of all time (though most do not make note of his career-ending injury). Packers' head coach Phil Bengtson overruled personnel director Pat Peppler, who had rated other players higher and who thought Moore would be available later in the draft. Vince Lombardi was still the Packers' general manager during the draft, but he was in negotiations to become head coach and general manager of the Washington Redskins, a deal which was finalized the next week. Peppler later said,  "Rich Moore was a disaster. Phil Bengtson fell in love with his size." Three players available when the Packers took Moore went on the Pro Football Hall of Fame: Roger Wehrli, Ted Hendricks and Charlie Joiner, and they also passed up other players who starred in the NFL for many years, such as Fred Dryer, Calvin Hill and Ed White.  Other Packers selections in the 1969 draft were also weak. The Packers' next pick, second round choice Dave Bradley, played in only 16 games in a career that ended in 1972, and by 1974 not one 1969 Packers pick remained on the team. Only 9th round choice Dave Hampton was in the NFL at all by 1975, finishing his NFL career with the Falcons and Eagles in 1976.

References
 Packers.com

1947 births
Living people
American football defensive tackles
Villanova Wildcats football players
Green Bay Packers players
Players of American football from Cleveland